John N. Scales is a former member of the Pennsylvania State Senate, serving from 1973 to 1974. Prior to his time in the Senate, he served as the District Attorney for Westmoreland County, Pennsylvania from 1969 to 1972 and as the Assistant District Attorney from 1966 to 1969. He was elected as a delegate to the Pennsylvania Constitutional Convention in 1967. An alumnus of Yale University and Harvard Law School, he was the college roommate of Dick Thornburgh, an eventual Pennsylvania Governor and United States Attorney General. Scales has also served on the Yale Board of Governors and in 2011 was awarded the Yale Medal, the school's highest honor for service to the university.

References

Democratic Party Pennsylvania state senators
Living people
Harvard Law School alumni
Yale University alumni
Year of birth missing (living people)